The cuneiform kur sign, (as Sumerogram, KUR), has many uses in both the 14th century BC Amarna letters and the Epic of Gilgamesh. It is routinely and commonly used to spell the Akkadian language word "mātu", for "land", "country"; also possibly "region". In EA 288, a letter from the Abdi-Heba, the Governor of Jerusalem, the kur sign is used eight times.

The alphabetic/syllabic uses and Sumerograms of the 'kur' sign from the Epic of Gilgamesh:

gìn
kur
lat
laț
mad
mat
šad
šat
GÌN (Sumerogram)s
KUR 
MAD

Its usage numbers from the Epic of Gilgamesh are as follows: gìn-(1), kur-(5), lat-(18), laț-(1), mad-(2), mat-(52), šad-(6), šat-(13),PA-(11), pa-(209), GÌN-(10), KUR-(72), MAD-(5). In the Amarna letters, an example usage is from EA 288 (Reverse), l. 35, defeated LAND-(kur) Nahrima.

References

Moran, William L. 1987, 1992. The Amarna Letters. Johns Hopkins University Press, 1987, 1992. 393 pages.(softcover)
 Parpola, 1971. The Standard Babylonian Epic of Gilgamesh, Parpola, Simo, Neo-Assyrian Text Corpus Project, c 1997, Tablet I thru Tablet XII, Index of Names, Sign List, and Glossary-(pp. 119–145), 165 pages.

Cuneiform signs